Sharon Lowen is an American Odissi dancer, trained since 1975 by Guru Kelucharan Mohapatra.  She has performed and choreographed for film and television and presented hundreds of concerts throughout India, North America, Asia, Africa, the United Kingdom. and the Middle East. Sharon came to India in 1973 after earning degrees in Humanities, Fine Arts, Asian Studies and Dance from the University of Michigan as a Fulbright Scholar to study Manipuri and later Chhau and Odissi.

Early life 
Sharon Lowen grew up in Detroit, United States, where her father was a chemical engineer and her mother a clinical psychologist. She trained in modern dance, Cecchetti ballet and classes at the Detroit Institute of Arts in puppetry, mime and theater since childhood, was a member of the Detroit Puppetry Guild, Puppeteers of America and UNIMA, performed with George Latshaw's puppets for the Detroit and Cleveland symphony orchestras and Jim Henson offered her an apprenticeship with the Muppets which was declined to accept a Fulbright scholarship to India.

Following her bachelor's degree in Humanities, Fine Arts, Asian Studies and an M.A. in Education and Dance, Lowen arrived in India on a Fulbright scholarship in 1973 to continue Manipuri dance with Guru Singhajit Singh at Triveni Kala Sangam, New Delhi. With extension and renewal of the Fulbright to 1975, she also trained in Mayurbhanj Chhau under Guru Krushna Chandra Naik, Odissi under Guru kelucharan Mohapatra, Manipuri Pala Cholam under Guru Thangjam Chaoba Singh and Manipuri Maibi Jagoi under Gurus Ranjana Maibi, Kumar Maibi and R.K. Achoubi Sana Singh.

She has lived and worked in India ever since, achieving success as a foreign-born expert performer and choreographer of classical Indian dance. Throughout her career, she has periodically returned to the United States, performing classical Indian dance recitals around the country during these visits.

Career

She taught dance in Michigan University as visiting professor 1975 and had more than 200 lectures and demonstrations to her credit.

She portrayed a herself in Indian Cinema, in a Telugu film Swarnakamalam. The film was directed by Dr.K.Viswanath. In the film she performs an Odissi dance and mesmerizes the audience of the film.

From Kashmir to Kanyakumari, Sharon has performed her own choreographies in Sanskrit, Odia, Telugu, Bengali, Malayalam, Tamil, Hindi, Kashmiri, Dogra alongside her guru's, including festivals at Khajuraho; Sankat Morchan Hanuman Jayanti, Varanasi; JNU Academy, Imphal; Kottakal Temple Festival; Bharat Bhavan, Bhopal; Kerala Kalamandalam Diamond Jubilee; Chaitra Parva Festival, Seraikella, Bihar; SNA Odissi Festival, Bhubaneswar; Chidambaram; Konarak; Trivandrum, Simla; Brihadeshwari Temple, Thanjavur.

Across the globe she has performed concerts, lecture-demonstrations and school performances in the United States, Canada, Mexico, England, Brazil, Japan, Kuwait, Dubai, South Africa, Malaysia, Singapore, Pakistan, Bangladesh, Lithuania, Slovak Republic, Ukraine, and Poland.

Lowen was instrumental in setting up the School of Visual and Performing Arts and Communication at Central University, Hyderabad; served as a member of the USIEF (then USEFI) board from 2003 to 2007.

She is committed to arts education and social upliftment expressed through choreography projects, benefit concerts and consultations for Deepalaya, Akshaypratisthan, Palna, Delhi Police School, and other government and private schools in New Delhi.

She founded the NGO Manasa-Art Without Frontiers with Kamalini Dutt and Naresh Kapuria to conduct, seminars, festivals, lecture demonstrations, classes and performances across artistic disciplines and communities.

Odissi
She not only teaches Odissi but also conducts workshops in Chhau and Manipuri dance. She is the first woman soloist of a previously all-male form, responsible for introducing Mayurbhanj Chhau to the United States at the 1978 Asian Dance Festival in Hawaii and later at the Olympic Arts Festival of Masks in Los Angeles and is singularly responsible for getting Chhau presented on Doordarshan' s National Broadcasts.

Seraikella Chhau
Sharon Lowen has had an immense impact on Chhau and has promoted its inclusion in arts education, both at national and international levels. She is responsible for introducing Mayurbhanj Chhau to the United States at the 1978 Asian Dance Festival in Hawaii and later at the Olympic Arts Festival of Masks in Los Angeles and also its presentation on Indian national television broadcasts. Sharon Lowen has been responsible in making Chhau popular in the West, which is making a difference in the awareness of the local history in the regions of Seraikela.

Manipuri
She has also choreographed and performed Odissi dance in Telugu, Bengali, Malayalam, Tamil, Hindi as well as Sanskrit and Oriya for performances and festivals around India, Doordarshan National Indian Television, and internationally .

Filmography
Swarnakamalam - Telugu

References

American female dancers
American dancers
American non-fiction writers
Living people
University of Michigan alumni
Odissi exponents
Chhau exponents
Performers of Indian classical dance
American expatriates in India
Year of birth missing (living people)
21st-century American women
20th-century American dancers
21st-century American dancers